Hajjiabad-e Zarrin (also Romanized as Ḩājjīābād-e Zarrīn; also known as Hāīī Ābād-e-Zarrīn, Hājīābād, and Ḩājjīābād) is a village in Zarrin Rural District of Kharanaq District of Ardakan County, Yazd province, Iran. At the 2006 National Census, its population was 310 in 80 households. The following census in 2011 counted 309 people in 109 households. The latest census in 2016 showed a population of 178 people in 65 households; it was the largest village in its rural district.

References 

Ardakan County

Populated places in Yazd Province

Populated places in Ardakan County